Margarita Miķelsone is a Latvian badminton player. She has won ten National Championships titles, once in the singles and mixed doubles events, and eight in the women's doubles event.

Achievements

IBF International 
Women's doubles

References

External links 
 

1982 births
Living people
Sportspeople from Riga
Latvian female badminton players